Davison's leaf warbler (Phylloscopus intensior) or the white-tailed leaf warbler, is a species of leaf warbler (family Phylloscopidae). It was formerly included in the "Old World warbler" assemblage.

It is found in the People's Republic of China, Laos, Myanmar, Thailand, and Vietnam. Its natural habitats are subtropical or tropical moist lowland forest and subtropical or tropical moist montane forest.

This species was described by the American ornithologist Herbert Girton Deignan in 1956 and given the trinomial name Phylloscopus davisoni intensior.

References

Davison's leaf warbler
Birds of South China
Birds of Southeast Asia
Davison's leaf warbler
Davison's leaf warbler
Taxonomy articles created by Polbot